Pearl Aday (born 1975) is an American singer. She is the adopted daughter of vocalist Michael Lee Aday, better known as Meat Loaf, and was a member of his touring band Neverland Express for nine years starting in the mid-1990s. She has appeared on numerous albums and in various tours and television performances with her father, both as backing singer and in duets. She has also been a backing singer for Mötley Crüe. She is currently the lead singer of her own band "Pearl" and has released her debut album on Megaforce/RED/Sony Music on January 19, 2010. Aday also co-organized the hard rock group Motor Sister with her husband Scott Ian, singing backing vocals.

Early life
Aday was born to Leslie G. Edmonds and Clark Pierson, who was a drummer in singer Janis Joplin’s group, Full Tilt Boogie Band. She was adopted by Meat Loaf as a young child, after his marriage to Leslie. Pearl has a half sister named Amanda Aday.

Aday attended High School in Redding, Connecticut graduating from Joel Barlow High School in 1993. Her senior year she was the lead in the Senior Class Play How to Succeed in Business Without Really Trying. Aday went to Emerson College in Boston, Massachusetts, majoring in creative writing, but shortly thereafter began a music career.

Career 
In 1994, she was a backing singer for Meat Loaf's 1994 Everything Louder summer tour promoting the album Bat out of Hell II, as well as the follow-up tour in 1996, Born to Rock. She was a member of her father's backing band when they performed at the inaugural ball in 1997 for Bill Clinton. She became a full-fledged member of Neverland Express, Meat Loaf's touring band, from 1998-2003. In 2003, she sang on Meat Loaf's album Couldn't Have Said It Better on the duet "Man of Steel." On October 31, 2007 Pearl supported Meat Loaf one concert on his Seize the Night tour.

She was portrayed in the 2000 TV movie To Hell and Back by Elisabeth Lund.

She was featured on an album by the band Filter and was a backing singer for Mötley Crüe on their "Maximum Rock" tour, featured on the DVD release of the tour, "Lewd, Crued, and Tattooed."  She was also with a Los Angeles-based band named Stella, fronted by Nancy Hower (Star Trek: Voyager), which broke up before releasing an album. She currently releases music with Pearl, a band in which she is the lead singer. The other musicians in the band are Mother Superior, best known for their work in The Rollins Band with Henry Rollins.

Aday is married to Anthrax guitarist Scott Ian. Her photographs appeared on Music of Mass Destruction: Live from Chicago released by Anthrax in 2004.

Aday now fronts the band Pearl which also features her husband Scott on guitar. In March 2008, they opened for Velvet Revolver in the UK.

Pearl opened for Meat Loaf's Casa de Carne Tour on July 4, 2008 (Bath, UK), July 11, 2008 (Castle Howard, York, UK), July 13, 2008 (Blickling Hall, Norfolk, UK), July 21, 2008 (Zitadelle Berlin, Germany) and on July 23, 2008 (Stadtpark Hamburg, Germany). In May 2009, she appeared on the FOX game show "Don't Forget the Lyrics" along with her father Meat Loaf and his duet partner Patti Russo: they won $500,000 for charity. She headlined her own 13-date 2010 US tour before rejoining Meat Loaf as an opening act in support of the Hang Cool Tour in 2010. In support of her first album, she also appeared on the January 21, 2010 episode of Jimmy Kimmel Live!. Both she and her husband took a break from their musical careers, as the couple had a son named Revel Young Ian on June 19, 2011.

Discography

Pearl
 Little Immaculate White Fox (2010)
 The Swing House Sessions (Live & Acoustic) (2011)
Heartbreak and Canyon Revelry (2018)

Pearl Aday has been featured on many different albums and compilations by various artists.

Meat Loaf 
Welcome to the Neighbourhood – backing vocals
Live Around the World – backing vocals
The Very Best of Meat Loaf – backing vocals
VH1 Storytellers – backing vocals
Couldn't Have Said It Better – duet and backing vocals on "Man of Steel", also a UK single release
"Los Angeloser" – backing vocals on B-side "Boneyard"

Filter
Title of Record – backing vocals

Mother Pearl
Broken Thorny Crown – lead vocals

Ace Frehley
Anomaly – backing vocals

Motor Sister
Ride (2015) – lead vocals

Black Star Riders
Testify or Say Goodbye (2017)
What Will It Take (2019)

Armored Saint
Win Hands Down (2015) – backing vocals on "With a Full Head of Steam"

References

External links 
Official Website www.ThePearlBand.com.
An interview with Meat Loaf and Pearl Aday, from the Times in the UK.
Pearl Aday multimedia — News, multimedia clips, biography
Pearl Aday on AllMusic
Pearl Aday on Discogs

1975 births
Living people
Neverland Express members
Place of birth missing (living people)
Emerson College alumni
21st-century American women singers
21st-century American singers